Luis Ulacia Álvarez (born September 24, 1963, in Havana, Cuba) is a Cuban baseball player and Olympic gold and silver medalist.

Ulacia has competed for the Cuba national baseball team. He is a two time Gold medalist for baseball, winning at the 1992 Summer Olympics and the 1996 Summer Olympics. Ulacia played for the Cuba national team in the 1999 Baltimore Orioles–Cuba national baseball team exhibition series.

He also won a Silver medal at the 2000 Summer Olympics for baseball

Ulacias was the manager of Camaguey baseball team.

Actually (2017), is the manager of the Sub-23 Camagüey baseball team.

References 
 
 

1963 births
Living people
Baseball players from Havana
Olympic baseball players of Cuba
Olympic silver medalists for Cuba
Olympic gold medalists for Cuba
Olympic medalists in baseball
Medalists at the 1992 Summer Olympics
Medalists at the 1996 Summer Olympics
Medalists at the 2000 Summer Olympics
Baseball players at the 2000 Summer Olympics
Baseball players at the 1992 Summer Olympics
Baseball players at the 1996 Summer Olympics
Pan American Games gold medalists for Cuba
Baseball players at the 1987 Pan American Games
Baseball players at the 1991 Pan American Games
Baseball players at the 1995 Pan American Games
Baseball players at the 1999 Pan American Games
Pan American Games medalists in baseball
Central American and Caribbean Games gold medalists for Cuba
Competitors at the 1986 Central American and Caribbean Games
Competitors at the 1990 Central American and Caribbean Games
Goodwill Games medalists in baseball
Central American and Caribbean Games medalists in baseball
Competitors at the 1990 Goodwill Games
Medalists at the 1991 Pan American Games
Medalists at the 1995 Pan American Games
Medalists at the 1999 Pan American Games